Tricks of the Shade is the debut album by American hip hop group the Goats. It was released on November 3, 1992 though Columbia Records sub-label, Ruffhouse Records and was produced by OaTie Kato and Joe "The Butcher" Nicolo.

Release
Tricks of the Shade was released on November 3, 1992 by Ruffhouse Records. The artwork was done by Oatie's brother and former Goats member, Vinnie Angel.

Two singles were released from the album, "¿Do The Digs Dug?" and "Typical American", the latter of which appeared on Ruffhouse Records' final release in 1999, the greatest hits compilation Ruffhouse Records Greatest Hits. "¿Do the Digs Dug?" was included on the 1992 Columbia Records Zebrahead soundtrack.

Content
Although largely touted as a theme album with a backstory following the two characters Chicken Little and Hangerhead as they make their way through Uncle Scam’s Federally Funded Welfare & Freakshow to find their mother who was jailed for attempting an illegal abortion, Tricks of the Shade features politically charged lyrics. It takes aim at such figures as then-US President George H. W. Bush, Christopher Columbus, and Daryl Gates. Criticism and observations were made upon topics such as militarism, police brutality, patriotism, classism, and racism. Other persons mentioned in songs include Nelson Mandela, Willie Horton, Yusef Hawkins, Minnesota Fats and Leonard Peltier.

Critical reception

Tricks of the Shade earned some critical acclaim, including 4 of 5 stars in its review by Rolling Stone, and an A from Robert Christgau in The Village Voice. In 2016, NME named it the 12th best album of 1993.

Track listing 
 "We Got Freaks" – 1:00
 "Typical American" – 4:36
 "Hangerhead Is Born" – 1:24
 "Whatcha Got Is Whatcha Gettin'" – 4:13
 "Columbus' Boat Ride" – 1:17
 "Ru Down wit da Goats" – 4:21
 "Cumin' in Ya Ear" – 3:51
 "Noriega's Coke Stand" – 1:30
 "Got Kinda Hi" – 3:23
 "Unodostresquattro" – 1:21
 "Georgie Bush Kids" – 1:17
 "Wrong Pot 2 Piss In" – 3:42
 "Hip-Hopola" – 4:42
 "Leonard Peltier in a Cage" – 1:24
 "¿Do the Digs Dug?" – 4:31
 "Carnival Cops" – 1:46
 "TV Cops" – 4:23
 "Tattooed Lady" – 1:36
 "Tricks of the Shade" – 4:19
 "Not Not Bad" – 3:29
 "Rovie Wade, the Sword Swallower" – 1:09
 "Aaah D Yaaa" – 3:26
 "Drive-By Bumper Cars" – 1:48
 "Burn the Flag" – 3:53
 "Uncle Scam's Shooting Gallery" – 2:46

References

1992 debut albums
Ruffhouse Records albums